Donaciella is a genus of leaf beetles from the subfamily of Donaciinae.

External links 
 BioLib Taxon profile — genus Donaciella Reitter, 1920

Chrysomelidae genera
Donaciinae
Taxa named by Edmund Reitter